Nędza  is a village in Racibórz County, Silesian Voivodeship, in southern Poland. It is the seat of the gmina (administrative district) called Gmina Nędza.

The village has a population of 3,344. It is a railroad junction, located on the main line from Kędzierzyn-Koźle to Racibórz. In Nędza, another line starts, which goes eastbound to Niedobczyce.

References

Villages in Racibórz County